Lamarchea is a genus of shrub in the myrtle family Myrtaceae described as a genus in 1830. The entire genus is endemic to Australia.

Species
 Lamarchea hakeifolia Gaudich. - Shire of Irwin in Western Australia
 Lamarchea sulcata A.S.George - Western Australia, Northern Territory

References

External links

Myrtaceae
Myrtaceae genera
Endemic flora of Australia